HD 125040 is a visual binary star system in the northern constellation of Boötes. It appears as a dim point of light near the lower limit of perception with the naked eye, having a combined apparent visual magnitude of 6.25. The system is located at a distance of approximately 106 light years from the Sun based on parallax measurements, but is drifting closer with a radial velocity of −7 km/s.

This was first reported to be a double by J. F. W. Herschel in 1830. They have a combined mass about double that of the Sun. The primary component is an F-type main-sequence star with a stellar classification of F8V. The system is a source for X-ray emission.

References

External links
 HR 5346
 CCDM J14165+2007
 Image HD 125040

F-type main-sequence stars
Binary stars
Boötes
Durchmusterung objects
125040
069751
5346